Marquard J. Schwarz (July 30, 1887 – February 17, 1968) was an American freestyle swimmer who competed in the 1904 Summer Olympics in Athens and the 1906 Summer Olympics in St. Louis, Missouri.

He competed as a member of the Missouri Athletic Club and attended Yale University.

In the 1904 Olympics, he won a bronze medal as a member of American 4x50 yard freestyle relay team. In the 1906 Olympics, he came in seventh in the 100 meters freestyle and fourth as a member of the 4x250 meter freestyle relay team.

See also
 List of Olympic medalists in swimming (men)

References

External links
 

1887 births
1968 deaths
American male freestyle swimmers
Olympic bronze medalists for the United States in swimming
Sportspeople from St. Louis
Swimmers at the 1904 Summer Olympics
Medalists at the 1904 Summer Olympics